Medkila IL is a football team from Harstad in North Norway, most notable for its women's football team which is playing in the 1. divisjon, the second tier of Norwegian women's football.

Medkila first came to prominence after winning the 2003 Norwegian Women's Cup while playing in the First Division. Medkila knocked out Leknes FK (1-10), Grand Bodø (1-5), IF Fløya (2-1), IL Sandviken (6-1) and Team Strømmen (1-3), and beat Kolbotn (2-1) in the final. That same year they were promoted to Toppserien for the first time. Medkila couldn't avoid relegation in their first season in top-flight and were back in 1. divisjon for the 2005 season.

Five years later they were promoted for the 2011 Toppserien, but as last time they were relegated after only one season. In 2012 they finished second in the first division, earning a playoff against Kattem for the chance to win promotion. They lost the playoff, but subsequently, Kattem withdrew their team from the league, and after Fart declined the offer to remain in Toppserien, Medkila were promoted after all.  In 2013, Medkila's women survived comfortably in 9th place in the Toppserien.

Medkila also fields a men's team, which played in the Third Division (fourth tier) from 1995 to 2010 and again from 2013.

Recent seasons
{|class="wikitable"
|-bgcolor="#efefef"
! Season
! 
! Pos.
! Pl.
! W
! D
! L
! GS
! GA
! P
!Cup
!Notes
|-
|2003
|1. divisjon
|align=right bgcolor=#DDFFDD| 2
|align=right|18||align=right|13||align=right|3||align=right|2
|align=right|57||align=right|27||align=right|42
| bgcolor=gold|Winner
|Promoted to the Toppserien
|-
|2004
|Toppserien
|align=right bgcolor="#FFCCCC"| 10
|align=right|18||align=right|2||align=right|1||align=right|15
|align=right|12||align=right|65||align=right|7
||Third round
|Relegated to the 1. divisjon
|-
|2005
|1. divisjon
|align=right |6
|align=right|18||align=right|6||align=right|2||align=right|10
|align=right|24||align=right|42||align=right|20
||Third round
|
|-
|2006
|1. divisjon
|align=right |5
|align=right|18||align=right|8||align=right|4||align=right|6
|align=right|35||align=right|25||align=right|28
||Second round
|
|-
|2007
|1. divisjon
|align=right |5
|align=right|18||align=right|7||align=right|6||align=right|5
|align=right|24||align=right|16||align=right|27
||Quarterfinal
|
|-
|2008
|1. divisjon
|align=right |4
|align=right|18||align=right|8||align=right|4||align=right|6
|align=right|22||align=right|25||align=right|28
||Second round
|
|-
|2009
|1. divisjon
|align=right |6
|align=right|22||align=right|9||align=right|5||align=right|8
|align=right|35||align=right|30||align=right|32
||Third round
|
|-
|2010
|1. divisjon
|align=right bgcolor=#DDFFDD| 2
|align=right|22||align=right|14||align=right|2||align=right|6
|align=right|39||align=right|18||align=right|44
||Third round
|Promoted to the Toppserien
|-
|2011
|Toppserien
|align=right bgcolor="#FFCCCC"| 11
|align=right|22||align=right|3||align=right|3||align=right|16
|align=right|20||align=right|63||align=right|12
||Quarterfinal
|Relegated to the 1. divisjon
|-
|2012 
|1. divisjon
|align=right bgcolor=#DDFFDD| 2
|align=right|22||align=right|15||align=right|4||align=right|3
|align=right|48||align=right|15||align=right|49
||Third round
|Promoted to the Toppserien
|-
|2013
|Toppserien
|align=right |9
|align=right|22||align=right|7||align=right|5||align=right|10
|align=right|27||align=right|44||align=right|26
||Quarterfinal
|
|-
|2014 
|Toppserien
|align=right |10
|align=right|22||align=right|4||align=right|3||align=right|15
|align=right|18||align=right|62||align=right|15
||Quarterfinal
|
|-
|2015 
|Toppserien
|align=right |11
|align=right|22||align=right|5||align=right|2||align=right|15
|align=right|28||align=right|63||align=right|17
||Quarterfinal
|
|-
|2016 
|Toppserien
|align=right |11
|align=right|22||align=right|2||align=right|5||align=right|15
|align=right|21||align=right|50||align=right|11
||Quarterfinal
|
|-
|2017
|Toppserien
|align=right bgcolor="#FFCCCC"| 12
|align=right|22||align=right|1||align=right|2||align=right|19
|align=right|9||align=right|69||align=right|5
||Second round
|Relegated to the 1. divisjon
|-
|2018 
|1. divisjon
|align=right |5
|align=right|22||align=right|10||align=right|4||align=right|8
|align=right|29||align=right|26||align=right|34
||Second round
|
|-
|2019
|1. divisjon
|align=right |4
|align=right|18||align=right|12||align=right|5||align=right|5
|align=right|37||align=right|33||align=right|41
||Third round
|
|-
|2020 
|1. divisjon
|align=right |2
|align=right|18||align=right|12||align=right|0||align=right|6
|align=right|33||align=right|21||align=right|36
||First qualifying round 
|
|}

Honours
 Norwegian Women's Cup (1): 2003

Current women's squad

Former players

Recent history men
{|class="wikitable"
|-bgcolor="#efefef"
! Season
!
! Pos.
! Pl.
! W
! D
! L
! GS
! GA
! P
!Cup
!Notes
|-
|2010
|3. divisjon
|align=right bgcolor="#FFCCCC"| 7
|align=right|22||align=right|9||align=right|5||align=right|8
|align=right|56||align=right|41||align=right|32
|Not Qualified
|Relegated to the 3. divisjon
|-
|2011 
|4. Divisjon
|align=right bgcolor=cc9966|3
|align=right|22||align=right|14||align=right|3||align=right|5
|align=right|74||align=right|43||align=right|45
|Not Qualified
|
|-
|2012
|4. Divisjon
|align=right bgcolor=#DDFFDD| 1
|align=right|20||align=right|18||align=right|1||align=right|1
|align=right|100||align=right|23||align=right|55
|Not Qualified
|Promoted to the 3. divisjon
|-
|2013
|3. divisjon
|align=right bgcolor=#DDFFDD| 1
|align=right|22||align=right|17||align=right|4||align=right|1
|align=right|71||align=right|24||align=right|55
|First qualifying round
|Promoted to the 2. divisjon
|-
|2014 
|2. divisjon
|align=right bgcolor="#FFCCCC"| 14
|align=right|26||align=right|2||align=right|1||align=right|23
|align=right|13||align=right|91||align=right|7
|First round
|Relegated to the 3. divisjon
|-
|2015 
|3. divisjon
|align=right |10
|align=right|22||align=right|4||align=right|4||align=right|14
|align=right|20||align=right|52||align=right|16
|First qualifying round
|
|-
|2016 
|3. divisjon
|align=right bgcolor="#FFCCCC"| 12
|align=right|22||align=right|1||align=right|2||align=right|19
|align=right|21||align=right|80||align=right|5
|First qualifying round
|Relegated to the 4. Divisjon
|-
|2017 
|4. Divisjon
|align=right |8
|align=right|22||align=right|7||align=right|3||align=right|12
|align=right|36||align=right|46||align=right|24
|Second qualifying round
|
|-
|2018 
|4. Divisjon
|align=right |5
|align=right|22||align=right|12||align=right|1||align=right|9
|align=right|49||align=right|37||align=right|37
|First qualifying round
|
|}

References

 
Football clubs in Norway
Association football clubs established in 1944
1944 establishments in Norway
Sport in Troms
Harstad